Lauren Hall (born February 2, 1979) is an American former racing cyclist. She competed in the 2013 UCI women's team time trial in Florence.

Major results

2010
 2nd Menlo Park Grand Prix
 9th Sea Otter Classic Criterium Race

2011
 1st Dilworth Criterium
 1st Stage 3 Tour de Toona
 1st Stage 4 Cascade Cycling Classic
 6th Overall Air Force Cycling Classic
 7th Beaufort Memorial Classic
 7th Sandy Springs Cycling Challenge
 8th Overall Aspen Snowmass Pro Race

2012
 National Road Championships
2nd Road race
2nd Criterium
 2nd Overall Premondiale Giro Toscana Int. Femminile – Memorial Michela Fanini
 4th Herman Miller Grand Cycling Classic
 5th Exergy Twilight Criterium

2013
 1st Stage 4 Tour of the Gila
 1st Stage 4 Cascade Cycling Classic
 National Road Championships
2nd Road race
4th Criterium
 4th Overall Merco Classic
 4th Old Pueblo Grand Prix
 4th Grand Prix Cycliste de Gatineau
 5th Chrono Gatineau
 8th Team time trial, UCI Road World Championships
 9th Overall North Star Grand Prix
1st Stage 2 
	
2014
 1st Gent–Wevelgem
 3rd Philadelphia Cycling Classic
 4th Team time trial, UCI Road World Championships
 National Road Championships
6th Road race
10th Time trial
 6th Chrono Gatineau
 9th Overall The Women's Tour

2015
 1st Stage 3 Holland Ladies Tour
 1st Stage 4 Cascade Cycling Classic
 2nd Andersen Banducci Twilight Criterium
 5th Team time trial, UCI Road World Championships
 5th Overall Women's Tour of New Zealand
1st Stages 1 (TTT), 2 & 5
 7th Overall Valley of the Sun
1st Stage 3
 10th Overall Tour of Colorado

2016
 3rd Overall Green Mountain
 5th Road race, National Road Championships
 6th Thompson Criterium of Doylestown
 8th Gran Prix San Luis Femenino

2017
 1st Sunny King Criterium
 3rd Overall The Gateway Cup
1st Stage 1

2018
 1st Grand Prix Cycliste de Gatineau
 1st Stage 2 Valley of the Sun

References

External links
 

1979 births
Living people
American female cyclists
Sportspeople from Vicksburg, Mississippi
21st-century American women